Ataxin 7 (ATXN7) is a protein of the SCA7 gene, which contains 892 amino acids with an expandable poly(Q) region close to the N-terminus. The expandable poly(Q) motif region in the protein contributes crucially to spinocerebellar ataxia (SCA) pathogenesis by the induction of intranuclear inclusion bodies. ATXN7 is associated with both olivopontocerebellar atrophy type 3 (OPCA3) and spinocerebellar ataxia type 7 (SCA7).

CAG repeat leads to pathological protein misfolding. In ataxin-7 gene has shown to cause cerebellar and brainstem degeneration as well as retinal conerod dystrophy. Polyglutamine (polyQ) expansion at the N-terminus of ataxin-7 causes protein aggregation, leading to the symptoms of ataxia with visual loss.

Research suggest that silencing of ataxin-7 in the retina by RNAi can be a possible therapeutic strategy for patients with SCA7 retinal degeneration.

References

Further reading

External links 
  GeneReviews/NCBI/NIH/UW entry on Spinocerebellar Ataxia Type 7
 
 

Proteins